Hyperolius kibarae is a species of frog in the family Hyperoliidae.
It is endemic to Democratic Republic of the Congo.
Its natural habitats are moist savanna, subtropical or tropical high-altitude grassland, swamps, and intermittent freshwater marshes.

References

Kibarae
Endemic fauna of the Democratic Republic of the Congo
Amphibians described in 1957
Taxonomy articles created by Polbot